Carabus akinini loudai is a black-coloured subspecies of beetle from Carabidae, that is endemic to Kyrgyzstan.

References

akinini loudai
Beetles described in 1987
Endemic fauna of Kyrgyzstan